Taska is an unincorporated community in Marshall County, in the U.S. state of Mississippi.

History
The community was named after Taska Davis, the sister of an early settler. A post office called Taska was established in 1899, and remained in operation until 1925.

References

Unincorporated communities in Mississippi
Unincorporated communities in Marshall County, Mississippi